Bibhuti Pattnaik (born 25 October 1937) is an Odia novelist and columnist.  Entered as a college lecturer in the Dept.of Odia Language and literature in the year 1970 and retired as a Reader, in the year 1995.

Literary creations
He has more than 150 books to his credit.

 Abhimana (Novel)
 Achinha Akash (novel)
 Adima aranya
 Adina Barsha
 Adina shrabana
 Aei gaon aie mati,
 Aei Mana ekanta Adima (novel) 
 Agneyagirire Bana Bhoji
 Akasha Kusuma (novel)
 Andharkarra sidi
 Aneka tarara ratri
 Annya Eka Varatabarsha
 Asabarna
 Ashok banara sita
 Aswamedhara Ghoda (novel)
 Athaa Kathi (novel)
 Badhu Nirupama (novel)
 Bandi jajabara
 Barnamala
 Baula Phulara Basna
 Bhala jhia kharap jhia
 Bidayabela
 Chahala Pnira Dheu
 Chapala Chhanda
 Chhabira Manisha
 Chhaya Chandrika
 Dagdha Phulabana (novel)
 Debakira karabasa
 Dekha Heba Anyadina (novel)
 Dhuli ghara
 Dina Jae Chinha Rahe (novel) 
 Dina Kala (novel)
 Dipasikha
 Dipatalara drushya
 Dipata sankha
 Ei mana brundabana
 Ekakini kuntala
 Ekanta adima
 Gare kajwala dhare luha
 Grahana
 Hasakandara chhanda
 He bandhu bidaya
 Irsara Iswari
 Jatila Samparka 
 Jibana Sauda (novel)
 Kalabati
 Kala baishakhi 
 Kali Kala (novel)
 Kesa bati kanya
 Khelaghara bhangigala
 Madhyanha ra dibaratri
 Mana bhalanahin
 Mayabi hrudaya
 Michhamaya (novel)
 Nadi nari khetra
 Nadi samudra
 Nagapheni
 Nasta charitra
 Nayikara Nama Srabani (novel)
 Nida nahin
 Nisanga bihangi
 Nisanga nakhyatra
 Oda matira swarga
 Panchama Upanyasa (novel)
 Parapurusha
 Prathama Sakala (novel)
 Prema o’ pruthibi
 Premika (Poetries)
 Priya bandhabi
 Priya Purusha (novel)
 Raga anuraga
 Ranganati
 Rani mahumachhi
 Rahu grasha
 Sati asati
 Samaya asamaya
 Samayasoka 
 Sandhya dipara sikha
 Sandhyaraga
 Sasthi
 Se dina chaitramasa
 Seli mausi
 Sesha abhinaya
 Sesha Basanta (novel)
 Sesha Ratira Surya (novel)
 Smrutira sudesna
 Snayura Saharare Shantibhanga 
 Suvarna
 Sultana
 Topae sindura dipata sankha
 Trutiya Purusha (Novel)
 Tume trushnara jala
 Ujani jamuna
 Adhunika Katha Sahitya
 Aranya Agni O Anyanya 
 Arundhatiru Amir khan
 Bharata Bibhajana
 Bibhuti Pattnaik ki chuni hui kahania (Hindi)
 Eswaranka Uthana Patana
 Galpa Samagra
 Gandhi Mahatma (features...)
 Se Eka Pragalva Nadi O AnyanyaKabita
 Tinoti Tarara Akash
 Manabhala Nahin (story)
 Rajakanyara Dukha (story)
 Kete Je Basanta Sate (story)
 Jibanara Jatilata (story)
 Uneisisaha Panchabana
 Nimnagami Mana
 Kichhi Jochhna Kichhi Andhakara
 Nila Akhira Nadi
 Keteje Basanta Sate
 Premagalpa
 Suryamukhi
 Lalita Labangalata
 Akhibujidele Satyajuga
 Nirbachita Galpa (story)
 Kalikal (novel)
 Dwarka Darshan (travelogue)
 Tire Tire Tirths (travelogue)
 Biography Mahatma (travelogue)
 Jana Nayaka (travelogue)
 Jibana Patra mo Bharicha Ketemate (autobiography)

Literary criticism
 Odiya Upanyasara Samajtantwika Rupa Rekha (sociological study of the novels of Fakir Mohan Ganapati, Kalindicharan Panigrahi, Gopinath, Mohanty and Kanhucharan Mohanty Bioneens of Odia novel)
 Sampratika Sahitya (collection of literary essays on contemporary Indian and world literature)
 Sahityara Suchipatra (essays on literary Forms and Movements)
 Biswa Sahityara Biswakarma (life and literature of makers of world literature)
 Iswaranka Uthan-Patana (Rise and fall of God – critical analysis of changing theme of literature

Awards 
 Atibadi Jagannath Das Samman, 2016 
 Central Sahitya Akademi Award, 2015
 Odisha living legend award, 2012
 Odisha Sahitya Academy, 1985
 Sarala Award, 1999
 Bisuba Melana Award
 Jhankar Award
 Sahitya Bharati Award, 2007

References

External links

 

1937 births
Living people
People from Jagatsinghpur district
Odia-language writers
Odia novelists
Odia short story writers
Indian academics
Indian male novelists
Indian male short story writers
Recipients of the Sahitya Akademi Award in Odia
Recipients of the Atibadi Jagannath Das Award
Recipients of the Odisha Sahitya Akademi Award
20th-century Indian short story writers
20th-century Indian novelists
Novelists from Odisha
20th-century Indian male writers